Vodovrati is a village in the municipality of Gradsko, North Macedonia.

Demographics
On the 1927 ethnic map of Leonhard Schulze-Jena, the village is written as Vodovrat and as a fully Muslim Bulgarian village.

As of the 2021 census, Vodovrati had 361 residents with the following ethnic composition:
Bosniaks 131
Roma 101
Macedonians 63
Turks 24
Persons for whom data are taken from administrative sources 23
Others 10
Albanians 9

According to the 2002 census, the village had a total of 379 inhabitants. Ethnic groups in the village include:
Bosniaks 192
Romani 79
Macedonians 60
Turks 16
Albanians 13
Serbs 4 
Others 15

References

Villages in Gradsko Municipality